March brown mayfly is a common name for several insects and may refer to:

Maccaffertium vicarium, native to North America
Rhithrogena germanica, native to Europe
, native to North America

Mayflies